Manduca ochus is a moth of the family Sphingidae first described by Johann Christoph Friedrich Klug in 1836.

Distribution 
It is found in Mexico, Belize, Nicaragua to Venezuela and Ecuador.

Description 
It can be distinguished from other Manduca species by the forewing pattern of a tawny brown and the mottled charcoal costal area. The upperside of the head and thorax are tawny and orange, and there are two pairs of submarginal black dots and a row of marginal black spots on the upperside of the forewing.

Biology 
There are probably two or three generations per year, with adults on wing in nearly all months in Costa Rica.

The larvae probably feed on Solanaceae species.

References

Manduca
Moths described in 1836
Taxa named by Johann Christoph Friedrich Klug